Teniet El Abed is a town in the Aurès Mountains of north-eastern Algeria. As of 2008 it had a population of 11,338 people.

History
On January 4, 2003. the Groupe Salafiste pour la Prédication et le Combat (GSPC) ambushed a military convoy at Teniet El-Abed, killing 43 soldiers and wounding 19.

Villages
The commune of Teniet El Abed consists of 25 localities

 Aïn Bendou
 Bali (or Baâli)
 Boughrara
 Draa Taga
 Guerza
 Halaoua Fedj El Kadi
 Khirbèche
 Hidous
 Lakhouada
 M'Zatra
 Moulia
 Ouassas
 Ouled Azzous
 Ouled Malem
 Ouled Si Abbès
 Sara
 Tafrount
 Tanakaret
 Taouzient El Kantara
 Tazourit
 Tchaghat
 Teniet El Abed
 Tizougaghine
 Tizribine
 Tleth

Notable people
Omar Derdour, figure of the Algerian War of Independence (1913-2009)
Jean Servier -ethnologist

References

Communes of Batna Province